Sangyuan is a town under the administration of Ju County in Shandong, China. , it has one residential community and six villages under its administration.

References 

Township-level divisions of Shandong
Ju County